Gadolinium(III) bromide is a crystalline compound of gadolinium atoms and three bromine atoms. This salt is hygroscopic.

Preparation
Gadolinium(III) bromide can be obtained by the reaction between gadolinium and hydrobromic acid:

The anhydrous form can be obtained by heating the hydrate with ammonium bromide.

References

Bromides
Gadolinium compounds
Lanthanide halides